Carpenter Mountain is located in Alleghany County, Virginia.

An unofficial variant name for Carpenter Mountain is Carpenter's Mountain.

References

External links

Landforms of Alleghany County, Virginia
Mountains of Virginia